Sports entertainment is a type of spectacle which presents an ostensibly competitive event using a high level of theatrical flourish and extravagant presentation, with the purpose of entertaining an audience. Unlike typical sports and games, which are conducted for competition, sportsmanship, physical exercise or personal recreation, the primary product of sports entertainment is performance for an audience's benefit. Commonly, but not in all cases, the outcomes are predetermined; as this is an open secret, it is not considered to be match fixing.

History
The term "sports entertainment" was coined by the World Wrestling Federation (WWF, now WWE) chairman Vince McMahon during the 1980s as a marketing term to describe the industry of professional wrestling, primarily to potential advertisers, although precursors date back to February 1935, when Toronto Star sports editor Lou Marsh described professional wrestling as "sportive entertainment". In 1989, the WWF used the phrase in a case it made to the New Jersey Senate for classifying professional wrestling as "sports entertainment" and thus not subject to regulation like a directly competitive sport.

Some sports entertainment events represent variants of actual sports, such as exhibition basketball with the Harlem Globetrotters. Others modify sport for entertainment purposes: many types of professional wrestling (which derived from traditional wrestling), and more recently many of the various mascot races held at numerous Major League Baseball games in-between innings. Roller derby was presented as a popular form of sports entertainment in the 1970s, though modern versions are legitimate competition.

Perceptions
Sports entertainment has a stigma of being mindless, low-level pop culture, in some cases glorifying violence for the sake of entertainment, and has been criticized as such in popular media, often through lampooning.

See also
 Barnstorm (sports)
 Exhibition game
 Kayfabe

References

 
Genres
Professional wrestling genres